Słupia  is a village in Jędrzejów County, Świętokrzyskie Voivodeship, in south-central Poland. It is the seat of the gmina (administrative district) called Gmina Słupia.

The village has an approximate population of 950.

References

Villages in Jędrzejów County
Kielce Governorate
Kielce Voivodeship (1919–1939)